Indiospastus is a moth genus in the family Autostichidae. It contains the species Indiospastus epenthetica, which is found in India (Sikkim).

References

Symmocinae